In mathematics, a measure-preserving dynamical system is an object of study in the abstract formulation of dynamical systems, and ergodic theory in particular. Measure-preserving systems obey the Poincaré recurrence theorem, and are a special case of conservative systems. They provide the formal, mathematical basis for a broad range of physical systems, and, in particular, many systems from classical mechanics (in particular, most non-dissipative systems) as well as systems in thermodynamic equilibrium.

Definition
A measure-preserving dynamical system is defined as a probability space and a measure-preserving transformation on it. In more detail, it is a system

with the following structure:

 is a set,
 is a measurable transformation which preserves the measure , i.e., .

Discussion
One may ask why the measure preserving transformation is defined in terms of the inverse  instead of the forward transformation . This can be understood in a fairly easy fashion. Consider a mapping  of power sets:

Every such conservative, Borel-preserving map can be specified by some surjective map  by writing . Of course, one could also define , but this is not enough to specify all such possible maps . That is, conservative, Borel-preserving maps  cannot, in general, be written in the form  one might consider, for example, the  map of the unit interval  given by  this is the Bernoulli map.

Note that  has the form of a pushforward, whereas  is generically called a pullback. Almost all properties and behaviors of dynamical systems are defined in terms of the pushforward. For example, the transfer operator is defined in terms of the pushforward of the transformation map ; the measure  can now be understood as an invariant measure; it is just the Frobenius–Perron eigenvector of the transfer operator (recall, the FP eigenvector is the largest eigenvector of a matrix; in this case it is the eigenvector which has the eigenvalue one: the invariant measure.)

There are two classification problems of interest. One, discussed below, fixes  and asks about the isomorphism classes of a transformation map . Measure-like, in that they preserve the Borel properties, but are no longer invariant; they are in general dissipative and so give insights into dissipative systems and the route to equilibrium.

In terms of physics, the measure-preserving dynamical system  often describes a physical system that is in equilibrium, for example, thermodynamic equilibrium. One might ask: how did it get that way? Often, the answer is by stirring, mixing, turbulence, thermalization or other such processes. If a transformation map  describes this stirring, mixing, etc. then the system  is all that is left, after all of the transient modes have decayed away. The transient modes are precisely those eigenvectors of the transfer operator that have eigenvalue less than one; the invariant measure  is the one mode that does not decay away. The rate of decay of the transient modes are given by (the logarithm of) their eigenvalues; the eigenvalue one corresponds to infinite half-life.

Informal example
The microcanonical ensemble from physics provides an informal example. Consider, for example, a fluid, gas or plasma in a box of width, length and height  consisting of  atoms. A single atom in that box might be anywhere, having arbitrary velocity; it would be represented by a single point in  A given collection of  atoms would then be a single point somewhere in the space  The "ensemble" is the collection of all such points, that is, the collection of all such possible boxes (of which there are an uncountably-infinite number).

In the case of an ideal gas, the measure  is given by the Maxwell–Boltzmann distribution. This measure is understood to apply to the ensemble. So, for example, one of the possible boxes in the ensemble has all of the atoms on one side of the box. One can compute the likelihood of this, in the Maxwell–Boltzmann measure. It will be enormously tiny, of order   Of all possible boxes in the ensemble, this is a ridiculously small fraction.

The only reason that this is an "informal example" is because writing down the transition function  is difficult, and, even if written down, it is hard to perform practical computations with it. Difficulties are compounded if the interaction is not an ideal-gas billiard-ball type interaction, but is instead a van der Waals interaction, or some other interaction suitable for a liquid or a plasma; in such cases, the invariant measure is no longer the Maxwell–Boltzmann distribution. The art of physics is finding reasonable approximations.

This system does exhibit one key idea from the classification of measure-preserving dynamical systems: two ensembles, having different temperatures, are inequivalent. The entropy for a given canonical ensemble depends on its temperature; as physical systems, it is "obvious" that when the temperatures differ, so do the systems. This holds in general: systems with different entropy are not isomorphic.

Examples
 Unlike the informal example above, the examples below are sufficiently well-defined and tractable that explicit, formal computations can be performed.

 μ could be the normalized angle measure dθ/2π on the unit circle, and T a rotation. See equidistribution theorem;
 the Bernoulli scheme;
 the interval exchange transformation;
 with the definition of an appropriate measure, a subshift of finite type;
 the base flow of a random dynamical system;
 the flow of a Hamiltonian vector field on the tangent bundle of a closed connected smooth manifold is measure-preserving (using the measure induced on the Borel sets by the symplectic volume form) by Liouville's theorem (Hamiltonian);
 for certain maps and Markov processes, the Krylov–Bogolyubov theorem establishes the existence of a suitable measure to form a measure-preserving dynamical system.

Generalization to groups and monoids
The definition of a measure-preserving dynamical system can be generalized to the case in which T is not a single transformation that is iterated to give the dynamics of the system, but instead is a monoid (or even a group, in which case we have the action of a group upon the given probability space) of transformations Ts : X → X parametrized by s ∈ Z (or R, or N ∪ {0}, or [0, +∞)), where each transformation Ts satisfies the same requirements as T above. In particular, the transformations obey the rules:
 , the identity function on X;
 , whenever all the terms are well-defined;
 , whenever all the terms are well-defined.

The earlier, simpler case fits into this framework by defining Ts = Ts for s ∈ N.

Homomorphisms
The concept of a homomorphism and an isomorphism may be defined.

Then a mapping

is a homomorphism of dynamical systems if it satisfies the following three properties:

 The map  is measurable.
 For each , one has .
 For -almost all , one has .

The map  is an isomorphism of dynamical systems if, in addition, there exists another mapping

that is also a homomorphism, which satisfies

 for -almost all , one has ;
 for -almost all , one has .

Hence, one may form a category of dynamical systems and their homomorphisms.

Generic points
A point x ∈ X is called a generic point if the orbit of the point is distributed uniformly according to the measure.

Symbolic names and generators
Consider a dynamical system , and let Q = {Q1, ..., Qk} be a partition of X into k measurable pair-wise disjoint pieces.  Given a point x ∈ X, clearly x belongs to only one of the Qi.  Similarly, the iterated point Tnx can belong to only one of the parts as well. The symbolic name of x, with regards to the partition Q, is the sequence of integers {an} such that

The set of symbolic names with respect to a partition is called the symbolic dynamics of the dynamical system.  A partition Q is called a generator or generating partition if μ-almost every point x has a unique symbolic name.

Operations on partitions
Given a partition Q = {Q1, ..., Qk} and a dynamical system , define the T-pullback of Q as

Further, given two partitions Q = {Q1, ..., Qk} and R = {R1, ..., Rm}, define their refinement as

With these two constructs, the refinement of an iterated pullback is defined as

which plays crucial role in the construction of the measure-theoretic entropy of a dynamical system.

Measure-theoretic entropy

The entropy of a partition  is defined as

The measure-theoretic entropy of a dynamical system  with respect to a partition Q = {Q1, ..., Qk} is then defined as

Finally, the Kolmogorov–Sinai metric or measure-theoretic entropy of a dynamical system  is defined as

where the supremum is taken over all finite measurable partitions. A theorem of Yakov Sinai in 1959 shows that the supremum is actually obtained on partitions that are generators.  Thus, for example, the entropy of the Bernoulli process is log 2, since almost every real number has a unique binary expansion. That is, one may partition the unit interval into the intervals [0, 1/2) and [1/2, 1]. Every real number x is either less than 1/2 or not; and likewise so is the fractional part of 2nx.

If the space X is compact and endowed with a topology, or is a metric space, then the topological entropy may also be defined.

Classification and anti-classification theorems
One of the primary activities in the study of measure-preserving systems is their classification according to their properties.  That is, let  be a measure space, and let  be the set of all measure preserving systems . An isomorphism   of two transformations  defines an equivalence relation  The goal is then to describe the relation . A number of classification theorems have been obtained; but quite interestingly, a number of anti-classification theorems have been found as well. The anti-classification theorems state that there are more than a countable number of isomorphism classes, and that a countable amount of information is not sufficient to classify isomorphisms.

The first anti-classification theorem, due to Hjorth, states that if  is endowed with the weak topology, then the set  is not a Borel set. There are a variety of other anti-classification results. For example, replacing isomorphism with Kakutani equivalence, it can be shown that there are uncountably many non-Kakutani equivalent ergodic measure-preserving transformations of each entropy type.

These stand in contrast to the classification theorems. These include:
 Ergodic measure-preserving transformations with a pure point spectrum have been classified.
 Bernoulli shifts are classified by their metric entropy. See Ornstein theory for more.

See also
Krylov–Bogolyubov theorem on the existence of invariant measures
Poincaré recurrence theorem

References

Further reading
 Michael S. Keane, "Ergodic theory and subshifts of finite type", (1991), appearing as Chapter 2 in Ergodic Theory, Symbolic Dynamics and Hyperbolic Spaces, Tim Bedford, Michael Keane and Caroline Series, Eds. Oxford University Press, Oxford (1991).  (Provides expository introduction, with exercises, and extensive references.)
 Lai-Sang Young, "Entropy in Dynamical Systems" (pdf; ps), appearing as Chapter 16 in Entropy, Andreas Greven, Gerhard Keller, and Gerald Warnecke, eds. Princeton University Press, Princeton, NJ (2003).  
 T. Schürmann and I. Hoffmann, The entropy of strange billiards inside n-simplexes. J. Phys. A 28(17), page 5033, 1995. PDF-Document (gives a more involved example of measure-preserving dynamical system.)

Dynamical systems
Entropy and information
Measure theory
Entropy
Information theory